A Girl's Desire is a 1922 American silent comedy film directed by David Smith and starring Alice Calhoun, Warner Baxter and  Frank Hall Crane.

Synopsis
A wealthy and socially ambitious American woman plans to buy social position by acquiring some heirlooms and an elaborate family tree. This leads on to a potential marriage between the American's daughter Elizabeth and Lady Dysart's son Cecil, only for the real Lord Dysart to appear disguised as a journalist.

Cast
 Alice Calhoun as Elizabeth Browne
 Warner Baxter as 	Jones / Lord Dysart
 Frank Hall Crane as 'Lord' Cecil Dysart 
 Lillian Lawrence as 	Lady Dysart
 Victory Bateman as Mrs. Browne
 James Donnelly as 	H. Jerome Browne
 Sadie Gordon as 	Miss Grygges
 Charles Dudley as Perkins
 Lydia Yeamans Titus as 	Cook
 Harry Pringle as 	Solicitor

References

Bibliography
 Connelly, Robert B. The Silents: Silent Feature Films, 1910-36, Volume 40, Issue 2. December Press, 1998.
 Munden, Kenneth White. The American Film Institute Catalog of Motion Pictures Produced in the United States, Part 1. University of California Press, 1997.

External links
 

1922 films
1922 comedy films
1920s English-language films
American silent feature films
Silent American comedy films
American black-and-white films
Films directed by David Smith (director)
Vitagraph Studios films
Films set in England
1920s American films